Pharnacia sumatrana or Sumatran Stick Insect is a species of stick insect endemic to Peninsular Malaysia, Sumatra, Java.

Description
Males have wings but are poor fliers.

References

External links
 
 Phasmida Species File
 Phasmid Study Group

Phasmatodea
Phasmatodea of Asia
Insects described in 1907
Taxa named by Carl Brunner von Wattenwyl